2004 in Korea may refer to:
2004 in North Korea
2004 in South Korea